Berecz is a surname. Notable people with the surname include:

Anna Berecz (born 1988), Hungarian alpine skiers
Ignácz Berecz (1912–1997), Hungarian cross country skier
Ilona Berecz (born 1947), Hungarian ice dancing coach and former competitor
Zsombor Berecz (sailor) (born 1986), Hungarian sailor
Zsombor Berecz (footballer) (born 1995), Hungarian footballer